Sarkandaugava Station is a railway station on the Zemitāni – Skulte Railway.

References 

Railway stations in Riga